Francis Godolphin is the name of:

Sir Francis Godolphin (1540–1608), governor of the Isles of Scilly, builder of Star Castle
Sir Francis Godolphin (died about 1640), younger son of the above, MP for St Ives and Cornwall
Francis Godolphin (died 1652) of Treveneage, MP for St Ives
Sir Francis Godolphin (1605–1667) of Godolphin,  MP for Helston, dedicatee of Hobbes' Leviathan
Francis Godolphin (died 1675), Auditor of the imprests in 1674
Francis Godolphin, 2nd Earl of Godolphin (1678–1766), British politician
Francis Godolphin, 2nd Baron Godolphin (1706–1785), British politician
Francis Osborne, 1st Baron Godolphin (1777–1850), British politician